"Tokyo" is a 2007 single released by Swedish artist Danny Saucedo, better known as Danny. In 2008, Danny participated with the song in Polish Sopot International Song Festival.

Chart performance 
The song entered and peaked at number 4 on the Swedish Trackslistan on 24 February 2007 and charted for six weeks. The song also peaked at number one on the Swedish singles chart on 22 February 2007.

Weekly charts

Year-end charts

References 

2007 singles
Number-one singles in Sweden
Songs written by Jonas von der Burg
Songs written by Niklas von der Burg
Songs written by Anoo Bhagavan
2007 songs
Sony Music singles
Danny Saucedo songs